Ashok Kumar Yadav (born 21 June 1970) is an Indian politician. He was elected to the Lok Sabha, lower house of the Parliament of India from Madhubani, Bihar in the 2019 Indian general election as member of the Bharatiya Janata Party. He was elected to the Bihar Legislative Assembly from Keoti (Vidhan Sabha constituency) as a member of Bharatiya Janata party in February 2005, October 2005 and again in 2010. He is the son of BJP leader Hukumdev Narayan Yadav.

References

External links
 Official biographical sketch in Parliament of India website

Living people
Lok Sabha members from Bihar
Bharatiya Janata Party politicians from Bihar
India MPs 2019–present
1970 births
Members of the Bihar Legislative Assembly